Baygildy (Baygilde) is a rural locality (a selo) in Staroyantuzovsky Selsoviet, Dyurtyulinsky District, Bashkortostan, Russia. The population was 378 as of 2010. There are 9 streets.

Geography 
Baygildy is located 30 km northeast of Dyurtyuli (the district's administrative centre) by road. Kazy-Yeldyak is the nearest rural locality.

References 

Rural localities in Dyurtyulinsky District